Zandra Borrero (born 17 July 1973) is a Colombian sprinter. She competed in the women's 100 metres at the 1996 Summer Olympics.

References

External links
 

1973 births
Living people
Athletes (track and field) at the 1996 Summer Olympics
Colombian female sprinters
Olympic athletes of Colombia
Place of birth missing (living people)
Olympic female sprinters
20th-century Colombian women